Bahjat is both a surname and a given name. Notable people with the name include:

Surname
 Atwar Bahjat (1976–2006), Iraqi journalist and reporter

Given name
 Bahjat Talhouni (1913–1994), Jordanian political figure
 Hani Bahjat Tabbara (born 1939), Jordanian diplomat
 Mohammad Taghi Bahjat Foumani (1917–2009), Iranian Shia Marja

Arabic-language surnames